Shapla Square (Shapla Chottor) is a huge sculpture at the heart of Motijheel near the center of Dhaka, the capital of Bangladesh. It depicts a Shapla (water lily, the species Nymphaea nouchali), the national flower of Bangladesh. The sculpture is surrounded by a fountain. 

The location also marks a mass grave of the Bangladesh Liberation War of 1971.

See also 
Allah Chattar, Muradnagar, Comilla
Madani Square, Sylhet

References 

Motijheel Thana
Squares in Bangladesh
Buildings and structures in Dhaka
Fountains in Bangladesh
Outdoor sculptures
Sculptures in Bangladesh
Tourist attractions in Dhaka